Iola is a village in Waupaca County, Wisconsin, United States. The population was 1,236 at the 2020 census. The village is bordered by the towns of Iola and Scandinavia. The community was named after a Potawatomi girl.

Geography
Iola is located at  (44.507951, -89.128661).

Demographics

2010 census
As of the census of 2010, there were 1,301 people, 590 households, and 341 families living in the village. The racial makeup of the village was 98.5% White, 0.2% African American, 0.3% Native American, 0.2% Asian, 0.2% of other races, and 0.7% of two or more races. Hispanic or Latino of any race were 1.2% of the population.

There were 590 households, of which 23.7% had children under the age of 18 living with them, 41.7% were married couples living together, 12.2% had a female householder with no husband present, 3.9% had a male householder with no wife present, and 42.2% were non-families. 37.6% of all households were made up of individuals, and 19.5% had someone living alone who was 65 years of age or older. The average household size was 2.12 and the average family size was 2.77.

The median age in the village was 46.8 years. 19.8% of residents were under the age of 18; 5.5% were between the ages of 18 and 24; 22.1% were from 25 to 44; 25.9% were from 45 to 64; and 26.6% were 65 years of age or older. The gender makeup of the village was 46.3% male and 53.7% female.

2000 census
As of the census of 2000, there were 1,298 people, 567 households, and 329 families living in the village. The population density was 757.1 people per square mile (293.1/km2). There were 618 housing units at an average density of 360.5 per square mile (139.5/km2). The racial makeup of the village was 98.07% White, 0.23% Black or African American, 0.08% Native American, 0.23% Asian, 0.23% of other races, and 1.16% of two or more races. 1.31% of the population were Hispanic or Latino of any race.

There were 567 households, out of which 25.2% had children under the age of 18 living with them, 45.9% were married couples living together, 9.5% had a female householder with no husband present, and 41.8% were non-families. 36.5% of all households were made up of individuals, and 17.8% had someone living alone who was 65 years of age or older. The average household size was 2.18 and the average family size was 2.87.

In the village, the population was spread out, with 22.7% under the age of 18, 5.1% from 18 to 24, 25.6% from 25 to 44, 21.2% from 45 to 64, and 25.5% who were 65 years of age or older. The median age was 42 years. For every 100 females, there were 82.8 males. For every 100 females age 18 and over, there were 78.3 males.

The median income for a household in the village was $32,829, and the median income for a family was $45,859. Males had a median income of $32,424 versus $22,031 for females. The per capita income for the village was $17,778. About 4.0% of families and 6.5% of the population were below the poverty line, including 7.0% of those under age 18 and 8.5% of those age 65 or over.

Transportation

Economy
Iola hosts the annual Iola Old Car Show with 120,000 attendees, 2,500 show cars, and 4,000 swap spaces.

For years Iola was the home of Krause Publications, a company that has published books for numismatics and other hobbies since March 1972. The Sports Collectors Digest is also published in Iola. Krause Publications was purchased by F + W Publications, which continued to operate it in Iola under the F + W name until the spring of 2018, when F + W Publications moved to Stevens Point, Wis.

Notable residents

 Dave Krieg, NFL quarterback; born in Iola
 Austen Lane, National Football League defensive end; born in Iola
 Joseph Leean, Wisconsin State Senator; born in Iola
 Albert L. Osborn, Wisconsin State Representative; born in Iola
 Barney S. Peterson, Wisconsin State Representative; lived in Iola
 Herman J. Severson, Wisconsin State Senator and jurist; lived in Iola
 Chester L. Krause, founder of Krause Publications
 Clifford Mishler, numismatist and author, former American Numismatic Association President
 Tim Polasek, football coach; born in Iola
 Kristian Welch, National Football League linebacker; born in Iola
 John Jackson Miller, Author; lives in Iola

References

External links

 
 Iola-Scandinavia Chamber of Commerce
 Iola Public Library
 Sanborn fire insurance map: 1911

Villages in Wisconsin
Villages in Waupaca County, Wisconsin